The Nusco Tower is a class A office building located in Bucharest near the Aurel Vlaicu metro station at the intersection of Barbu Văcărescu street and Şoseaua Pipera.

See also
List of tallest buildings in Romania

External links

Skyscraper office buildings in Bucharest
Office buildings completed in 2010